Anatol Ugorski (in , born 28 September 1942 in Rubtsovsk, Altai Krai, Soviet Union) is a classical pianist of Russian origin who lives in Germany.

Biography 
Anatol Ugorski was born into a poor background and is the eldest of five children. In 1945 his parents moved to Leningrad where he attended his first school, singing and playing the xylophone. At the age of six he passed selection for the Saint Petersburg Conservatory where he studied until 1960. He was subsequently admitted to the Conservatory of Leningrad in the piano class of Nadezhda Gouloubovskaia with whom he worked until 1965. As a student he attracted attention through the interpretation of avant-garde pieces; abandoning the repertoire traditionally devoted to Russian pianists, he played in the USSR some of the works of controversial Western composers such as Arnold Schönberg (Pierrot Lunaire), Alban Berg, Olivier Messiaen and Pierre Boulez, assisted by his wife, musicologist Maja Elik. In 1968, he won third prize in the George Enescu International Piano Competition.

During a concert tour in Leningrad by Pierre Boulez in autumn 1968, in a period of relative cultural openness (shortly after the Prague Spring and the invasion of the Warsaw Pact troops), Ugorski's enthusiastic applause was interpreted as a political gesture. He was summoned by the Rectorate and suspected of being politically unreliable, because of his passion for Western contemporary music and his origins. His career was stopped for more than ten years and he was confined to a post as accompanist of the Young Pioneers choir. The choir was allowed to perform only in the Soviet bloc and for remote provincial schoolchildren, or private concerts - though it was always fully attended.

Irene Dische comments: "In this perfect artistic freedom, he played only for himself." His solo concerts became very popular. Ugorski confided that his best Scarlatti concert he performed for children in the industrial city of Asbest. It was only in 1982, under the pressure of his artistic reputation, that he obtained a post of professor at the Leningrad Conservatory.

Until then, there had been no question of emigrating, but in the spring of 1990 Dina Ugorskaja, then 16 and also a pianist and pupil of the Conservatory, suffered antisemitic harassment and felt threatened. The Ugorski family escaped without preparation or papers for East Berlin, living in a refugee camp for several months. Ugorski recorded his first album in 1991 with the Diabelli Variations for Deutsche Grammophon, with whom he signed an exclusive contract.

Ugorski's international career was launched in 1992 when he was fifty years old and soon to be naturalized. His first spectacular concerts took place in the Milan Conservatory and at the Vienna Festival. He performed either solo or with orchestras such as the WDR Symphony Orchestra Cologne, the Czech Philharmonic, the Concertgebouw in Amsterdam, the Orchestre de Paris and the Chicago Symphony Orchestra, and regularly participates in the most important festivals in the world.

Until 2007, Ugorski was a piano teacher at the Hochschule für Musik Detmold, where he lived. He was also a member of the jury of the ARD International Music Competition in Munich.

Recordings 
Ugorski has published numerous piano recordings from the nineteenth and twentieth centuries. Among his most important recordings are Catalogue d'oiseaux by Olivier Messiaen (Echo Klassik prize 1995) and the Piano Concerto in F-sharp minor, Op. 20 by Scriabin with the Chicago Symphony Orchestra directed by Pierre Boulez. For this recording, Ugorski was nominated for a Grammy Award in February 2000. He and his daughter Dina Ugorskaja recorded the concertos for two pianos by Bach (BWV 1060), Mozart (K.365) and Shostakovich (Op. 94). In 2010, he played the complete sonatas of Scriabin for Cavi-music. He also recorded the Piano Quintet by Shostakovich, for Oehms Classics (2014).

 Beethoven, Piano sonata Op. 111; Bagatelles Op. 126; Für Elise; Rondo and Cappricio Op. 129 (1992, DG 435 881-2)
 Beethoven, Diabelli Variations (1991, DG) 
 Messiaen, Catalogue d'oiseaux (2003, 3CD DG) 
 Moussorgski, Pictures at an Exhibition; Stravinski, 3 mouvements of Petrouchka (1992, DG 435 882-2) 
 Schumann, Davidsbündlertänze Op. 6; Schubert, Wanderer Fantasy D.760 / Op. 15 (September 1992, DG 437 539-2) 
 Scriabin, Piano Concerto; Prométhée (1999, DG )
 Scriabin, Sonatas 1-10 (2010, 2CD Cavi-Music)

LP:

 Bach, Viola Sonatas BWV 1027-1029 - Yuri Kramarov, viola; Ugorski, harpsichord (1976, LP Melodiya C10 67925-26)

References

External links 
 
 Anatol Ugorski, a writing pianist 
  Biography on Munzinger-Archiv
  Hochschule für Musik de Detmold
  For Anatol Ugorski's 70th anniversary Reinhard Palmer, on nmz.de
 Anatol Ugorski on Archiv Music
 Anatol Ugorski on Musical World
 Anatol Ugorski on Last.FM
 Anatol Ugorski on Discogs
 Anatol Ugorski plays Scarlatti, Weber, Scriabin, Stravinski etc. 1995 on YouTube

People from Rubtsovsk
1942 births
Living people
Russian classical pianists
Male classical pianists
Deutsche Grammophon artists
Jewish classical pianists
Soviet classical pianists
Russian music educators
Academic staff of Saint Petersburg Conservatory
21st-century classical pianists
21st-century Russian male musicians